Alessandro Fratangelo (born 7 May 1998) is an Italian football player. He plays for Granamica ASD in Eccellenza as a forward.

Club career

Teramo 
On 27 August 2016, Fratangelo made his professional debut, in Serie C, for Teramo, as a substitute replacing Alessandro Di Paolantonio in the 72nd minute of a 2–0 away defeat against Lumezzane. In October 2016 he suffers an ankle injury that will keep him off the field for about 2 months. On 19 November he scored his first professional goal, as a substitute, in the 79th minute of a 3–2 home win over Ancona. On 11 December, Fratangelo played his first match as a starter, a 1–1 away draw against Parma, he was replaced by Marco Sansovini in the 80th minute. On 1 April 2017 he scored his second goal in the 29th minute of a 2–1 home win over Sambenedettese.

Later career
After playing for Serie D clubs Pineto Calcio and Sasso Marconi Zola, Fratangelo moved to Eccellenza club Granamica ASD on 13 December 2019.

Career statistics

Club

References

External links 
 
 

1998 births
Living people
Italian footballers
Association football forwards
S.S. Teramo Calcio players
Serie C players
Serie D players
Eccellenza players